Victoria Law, familiarly known as Vikki Law, is an American anarchist activist, prison abolitionist, writer, freelance editor, and photographer. Her books are Resistance Behind Bars: The Struggles of Incarcerated Women (2009, 2012), Don't Leave Your Friends Behind: Concrete Ways to Support Families in Social Justice Movements and Communities (edited with China Martens, 2012), Prison by Any Other Name: The Harmful Consequences of Popular Reforms (co-authored by Maya Schenwar, 2020), and Prisons Make Us Safer: And 20 Other Myths about Mass Incarceration (2021).

Background and education 
Victoria Law is of Chinese descent and was born and raised in Queens, New York. As an A student in high school, she committed armed robbery to initiate herself into a Chinatown gang, but was given probation as a first offense. Her exposure to incarcerated people at Rikers Island prompted her to get involved in prison support.

Career
Law continued fighting for prison abolition, co-founding Books Through Bars NYC as a joint project between Blackout Books and Nightcrawlers Anarchist Black Cross in 1996 at the age of nineteen. In 2003, at the prompting of women incarcerated in an Oregon prison, she launched the zine Tenacious: Art and Writing from Women in Prison. In 2009, after a decade of researching and writing about incarcerated women in the United States, Law published her first monograph with PM Press, Resistance Behind Bars: The Struggles Of Incarcerated Women, with a second edition released in 2012. She is a frequent invited speaker, especially since publishing the first edition of Resistance Behind Bars.

Law works with Books Through Bars (now located at Freebird Bookstore in Brooklyn). She has participated in many of ABC No Rio's projects, including its Visual Arts Collective and the darkroom that she co-founded and co-built. She has had tangential involvement in the punk collective, as well, and was the primary caregiver of art and activist space's last remaining squatter, Cookiepuss (1996–2013), a calico cat.

In her twenties, after having a child, Law's activism began to include raising awareness of parents in anarchist communities' need for solidarity, including free childcare activities at events and protests. Together with long-time mamazine maker China Martens, Law began doing workshops and editing compilation zines about parenting for activists and their allies, called Don't Leave Your Friends Behind. The two eventually co-edited a book by the same name, also published by PM Press. As her child got older and Law engaged with the literature her child read, Law began to focus attention on the lack of racial diversity in young adult fiction, including writing a series of blog posts on girls of color in dystopia for Bitch Media.

Selected works

Books 

 Prisons Make Us Safer: And 20 Other Myths about Mass Incarceration, Beacon Press, 2021

 Prison by Any Other Name: The Harmful Consequences of Popular Reforms. The New Press, 2020. Co-authored by Maya Schenwar

 Resistance Behind Bars: The Struggles of Incarcerated Women, PM Press, 2012, 2009
Don't Leave Your Friends Behind: Concrete Ways to Support Families in Social Justice Movements and Communities, PM Press, 2012. Edited with China Martens

Zines 
In addition to many zines she has authored or edited:
 Tenacious: Art & Writing from Women in Prison, 2003–2020, editor
 Nefarious Doings series, about travel in Hong Kong and South Africa, 2006
 Mamazines, contributor

Articles, blog posts and web articles 
In addition to print articles about gender, incarceration and resistance, she is a regular contributor to online news and culture venues, including Bitch Media, The Nation, and Truthout, among others.

Awards 
 2013, Health Behind Bars Fellowship, John Jay’s Center on Media, Crime and Justice  
 2011, Brooklyn College Young Alumna Award 
 2009, Prevention for a Safer Society PASS Award for book Resistance Behind Bars: The Struggles of Incarcerated Women

References

External links 

Resistance Behind Bars site

1977 births
Living people
American anarchists
American women writers
American people of Chinese descent
Brooklyn College alumni
 Prison abolitionists